Lofty Promenade is an inclined glacial course,  long and  wide, in the eastern part of Ross Island, Antarctica. The feature is partly framed between the southern elements of the Kyle Hills and Guardrail Ridge, as it descends east-southeast from  near Mount Terror to  near the Allen Rocks. The glacial surface is relatively smooth and affords an unobstructed route between the Cape Crozier area and Mount Terror. The name, given by the Advisory Committee on Antarctic Names in 2000, is allusive and refers to a public place for taking a leisurely walk.

References

Ice slopes of Antarctica
Landforms of Ross Island